Huiscatongo (possibly from Aymara wiska wool rope, tunqu maize "rope maize") is a mountain in the east of the Huanzo mountain range in the Andes of Peru, about  high. It is situated in the Cusco Region, Chumbivilcas Province, Santo Tomás District. Huiscatongo lies between the mountains Quilca in the north and Puca Puca in the south.

References 

Mountains of Peru
Mountains of Cusco Region